Gammarus locusta is a species in the family Gammaridae ("scuds"), in the order Amphipoda ("amphipods").

References

External links
NCBI Taxonomy Browser, Gammarus locusta

locusta
Crustaceans described in 1758
Taxa named by Carl Linnaeus